Jean Rougier Cohu (generally known as J. R. Cohu) was an Anglican priest, school headmaster and author.

Biography
Cohu was educated at Jesus College, Oxford, obtaining a first-class degree in Literae Humaniores in 1880.  He was a Fellow of Jesus College from 1882 to 1890.  He taught at Dulwich College as sixth-form master for a year, and was headmaster of Plymouth College for a time before becoming headmaster of Richmond, North Yorkshire Grammar School (1884 to 1890). He was appointed rector of Remenham in 1890, moving to Aston Clinton in 1904, a position he held until his retirement in 1930.

He published a number of books on biblical subjects, including Vital Problems of Religion (1914), described in his obituary as "a clear and attractive discussion of some of the great problems underlying spiritual experience in the light of the best available modern thought."

Publications

 Through Evolution to the Living God (1912)
 The Bible and Modern Thought
 The Gospels in Light of Modern Research
 Saint Paul in Light of Modern Research
 The Old Testament in Light of Modern Research
 Oremus: Or, the Place of Prayer in Modern Religious Life

References

Year of birth missing
1935 deaths
20th-century English Anglican priests
Alumni of Jesus College, Oxford
Fellows of Jesus College, Oxford